Edmonton—Mill Woods—Beaumont (originally known as Edmonton—Beaumont) was a federal electoral district in Alberta, Canada, that was represented in the House of Commons of Canada from 2004 to 2015.

Geography
Edmonton–Mill Woods–Beaumont includes the neighbourhoods of Tweddle Place, Michaels Park, Richfield, Lee Ridge, Tipaskan, Kameyosek, Meyonohk, Satoo, Ekota, Menisa, Greenview, Hillview, Tawa, Meyokumin, Sakaw, Jackson Heights, Kiniski Gardens, Flynn Dell, Minchau, Weinlos, Bisset, Daly Grove, Pollard Meadows, Crawford Plains, Larkspur, The Meadows, Wildrose, Ellerslie, Wernerville and Meadows Area in the City of Edmonton, the Town of Beaumont and the small part of Leduc County that is located between Edmonton and Beaumont. The area of the district is 175 km².

History
The electoral district was created as "Edmonton–Beaumont" in 2003 from the vast majority of Edmonton Southeast, a small part of Wetaskiwin, and a fraction of Elk Island.

In 2004, it was renamed "Edmonton–Mill Woods–Beaumont".

Members of Parliament

This riding has elected the following Members of Parliament:

Elections results

Edmonton–Mill Woods–Beaumont, 2006–present

Edmonton–Beaumont, 2004–2006

See also
 List of Canadian federal electoral districts
 Past Canadian electoral districts

References

Notes

External links
 
 
 Expenditures - 2008
 Expenditures - 2004

Former federal electoral districts of Alberta
Politics of Edmonton